Khalifa Mohammad Asadullah (6 August 1890 – 23 November 1949) was a pioneer of the library movement in the Indian subcontinent before 1947. He was also the first prominent librarian to opt for Pakistan at the time of independence in 1947.

Early life
He was born on 6 August 1890 in Lahore, British India (now Pakistan) to Maulvi Mohammd Ziaullah and Alam Jan of Simla. He received his basic education in Lahore and graduated from Forman Christian College, Lahore in 1913.

Marriage and family
In 1908, he married Hameeda Begum in Lahore and fathered 14 children. His sons included Khalifa Mohd Iftikharullah TQA, Khalifa Mohd Naseemullah, Khalifa Mohd Hameedullah, Khalifa Mohd Ihsanullah, Khalifa Mohd Zafarullah (Commander Pak Navy), Khalifa Mohd Aminullah.  His sons-in-law included AVM Saeedullah Khan and Pakistani diplomat, Enver Murad; his daughters-in-law included Zaib-un-Nissa Hamidullah and his great granddaughters include the Pakistani novelist, Uzma Aslam Khan.

Training
He studied under the American librarian Asa Don Dickinson in 1915 at the University of the Punjab.

Career
In 1916, he became the first qualified librarian of the Government College in Lahore. He then became the librarian of MAO College (now Aligarh Muslim University) in 1919. In 1921, he joined the Imperial Secretariat Library in New Delhi and Simla, a post he held for 8 years.

In 1930, he was appointed the Librarian of the Imperial Library (now National Library of India) in Calcutta, a post which he held for about 17 years from 1930 – 1947. While there, he started the library training programme.

Pakistan
In 1947, after the independence of Pakistan, he was made officer on special duty in the Ministry of Education.

Indian Library Association
In 1933, he was one of the founding members of Indian Library Association and was its first Secretary from 1933 to 1947. He had served as the Librarian and a Director from 1930 – 1947 of the Imperial Library of India in British India.

Honours
He was honoured with the title of Khan Bahadur in  1935.

Death
He died on 23 November 1949 due to a stroke at Lahore, Pakistan. He was buried in his family section of the Ferozpur Road graveyard, Lahore.

References

Pakistani librarians
Indian librarians
People from Lahore
People from Shimla
1890 births
1949 deaths
Academic staff of the Government College University, Lahore
Forman Christian College alumni